In enzymology, a steroid 9alpha-monooxygenase is an enzyme that catalyzes the chemical reaction

pregna-4,9(11)-diene-3,20-dione + AH2 + O2  9,11alpha-epoxypregn-4-ene-3,20-dione + A + H2O

The 3 substrates of this enzyme are pregna-4,9(11)-diene-3,20-dione, an electron acceptor AH2, and O2, whereas its 3 products are 9,11alpha-epoxypregn-4-ene-3,20-dione, the reduction product A, and H2O.

This enzyme belongs to the family of oxidoreductases, specifically those acting on paired donors, with O2 as oxidant and incorporation or reduction of oxygen. The oxygen incorporated need not be derive from O miscellaneous.  The systematic name of this enzyme class is steroid,hydrogen-donor:oxygen oxidoreductase (9-epoxidizing). This enzyme is also called steroid 9alpha-hydroxylase.  It has 2 cofactors: FMN,  and Iron-sulfur.

References 

 

EC 1.14.99
Flavoproteins
Iron-sulfur enzymes
Enzymes of unknown structure